Alfredo Rivadeneyra Hernández (born 8 June 1971) is a Mexican politician affiliated with the PAN. He currently serves as Deputy of the LXII Legislature of the Mexican Congress representing the Mexico State.

References

1971 births
Living people
Politicians from the State of Mexico
Members of the Chamber of Deputies (Mexico)
National Action Party (Mexico) politicians
21st-century Mexican politicians
Deputies of the LXII Legislature of Mexico